Najib Effendi Al-Yasin was the first mayor of Haifa during the Ottoman Empire's era between 1873–1877.

Biography
Najib Effendi was born to a noble aristocratic Turkish family during the ruling age of the Ottoman Empire, at the beginning of his life he worked as a lawyer. He is first mayor of Haifa.

Najib Effendi as an eminent Turkish politician who worked and served the empire for a long time and dedicated his time for his work he has been awarded many medals of honour.

One of the most remarkable medals he received is a medal of honour by Wilhelm II of Germany during his visit to Haifa on October 25, 1898.

References

Year of birth missing
Year of death missing
Mayors of Haifa
Political office-holders in the Ottoman Empire
19th-century people from the Ottoman Empire